Abutilon yellows virus  (AbYV (sometimes AYB) is a virus of the genus Crinivirus.

Particle lengths were measured at 800-850 nm.  Partial sequencing has taken place but full sequencing was not complete as of 2008.

Criniviruses are considered a threat to crops, though less so than viruses the other whitefly transmitted virus genus Begomovirus, which are predominant in both number and effect.

Vector
The vector is the banded-wing whitefly, Trialeurodes abutiloneus.

References

External links

 Coat protein [Abutilon yellows virus] Liu, H.-Y. and Duffus, J. E.

Crinivirus